The Osborne Brothers, Sonny (October 29, 1937 – October 24, 2021) and Bobby (born December 7, 1931), were an influential and popular bluegrass act during the 1960s and 1970s and until Sonny retired in 2005. They are probably best known for their No. 33 1967 country hit song, "Rocky Top", written by Felice and Boudleaux Bryant and named after a Tennessee location.

Biography
The Osbornes were born in Roark, Kentucky, on Jack's Creek, but they moved to Hyden, after their house burned down. They then moved near Dayton, Ohio, where they grew up and performed as entertainers in southwestern Ohio. In 1952, during the Korean War, Bobby was drafted and served in the United States Marine Corps. Sonny went to work with the "Father of Bluegrass Music" Bill Monroe. Following Bobby's discharge, the Osbornes teamed up with Jimmy Martin, performing at radio stations WROL in Knoxville, Tennessee and WJR in Detroit, Michigan. At their only session together, on November 16, 1954, the Osbornes and Martin recorded six songs for RCA Victor. In late 1955, the Osbornes left Martin and moved to Wheeling, West Virginia, where they performed on WWVA Jamboree until Christmas, together with Charlie Bailey. They returned to Dayton in early 1956 playing the local clubs with guitarist Enos Johnson. When Johnson left, the Osbornes added guitarist Red Allen and fiddler Art Stamper to form a new group.

The Osborne Brothers and Red Allen (under the pseudonym Stanley Alpine) recorded for Gateway Records in February or March 1956 cutting eight instrumentals. In the spring of 1956, Tommy Sutton, a local disc jockey, helped the Osborne Brothers get a recording contract with MGM Records. The new group, with the Osbornes on banjo and mandolin, Allen on guitar, Ernie Newton on bass, Tommy Jackson and Art Stamper on fiddles, made their MGM recording debut on July 1, 1956. Their first released 45 RPM single for MGM containing "Ruby Are You Mad" became a huge success and led to the Osbornes being signed on as regular members of the WWVA Jamboree in October 1956. The "Jamboree version" of the group comprised Ricky Russell on dobro, Johnny Dacus on fiddle and Ray Anderson on bass. "Ruby Are You Mad" marks the first time twin banjos were used on a bluegrass recording. On October 17, 1957, at their third session for MGM, the Osbornes, always experimenting with their sound, added a dobro and drums, also for the first time on a bluegrass recording. In April 1958, Red Allen, who was the last musician to receive billing next to the Osborne Brothers, left the group.

Upon their breaking into the bluegrass scene, the Osborne Brothers quickly became known for their virtuoso instrumentation and tight, melodic vocal harmonies. They first made the country chart in 1958 with "Once More", performing as a trio with Red Allen. The song featured a novel inverted stacked harmony. Bobby sang the lead line highest, with Sonny singing baritone, and the third singer (Red Allen) singing tenor as the lowest part. This made Bobby's distinctive voice the lead, and the third voice was somewhat interchangeable. As a result, they could hire others guitarist and singers without changing the overall sound. The "high lead" vocal trio became their signature, and they used to great effect in the country market with songs like "Blame Me", "Sweethearts Again", and a remake of the Carter Family's "Fair and Tender Ladies".

During the 1960s, the Osbornes caused minor controversy among Bluegrass music purists by incorporating electronic and percussion instruments in their live acts and studio work. In 1960 they became the first bluegrass group to play on a college campus, performing at Antioch College. In 1963 they signed with Decca Records. On August 8, 1964, the Osborne Brothers were inducted as members of the Grand Ole Opry.

The Osborne Brothers recorded their hit “Rocky Top” in November 1967. Released on December 25, 1967, it sold 85,000 copies in only two weeks, and was named an official Tennessee state song in 1982. In 1973 the Osborne Brothers became the first bluegrass group to perform at the White House.

In 1994, The Osborne Brothers were inducted into the International Bluegrass Music Association's Hall of Honor.

Hits
Their song "Ruby Are You Mad" came in 1956 after signing with MGM Records (1956) and began a string of hits through 1986. Among them were "Once More" (1958), "Up This Hill & Down" (1965), "Making Plans" (1965), "Rocky Top" (1967), "Tennessee Hound Dog" (1969), and "Midnight Flyer" (1972). The Osborne Brothers' final chart appearance came in late 1986 with a new version of "Rocky Top".

Current status
Bobby continues to perform with his band Rocky Top X-press, which includes two of his three sons. They performed May 31, 2013, at the rededication marking new ownership of The Gatlinburg Inn, where Boudleaux and Felice Bryant wrote "Rocky Top," and the couple's sons, Dane and Del Bryant, were on hand.

Sonny retired in 2005 and died in 2021.

Notable band members
Johnathan Smith, Organ/Keys
Red Allen, guitar
Benny Birchfield, guitar/banjo
Paul Brewster, guitar
Jimmy D. Brock, bass
Grady Martin, guitar
Shawn Camp, fiddle
Jimmy Campbell, fiddle
Shad Cobb, fiddle
Donnie Collins, guitar
David Crow, fiddle
Derek Deakins, fiddle
Dennis Digby, bass
Glen Duncan, fiddle
Boyce Edwards, fiddle
Bill Edwards, guitar
Terry Eldredge, bass/guitar
Harley Gabbard, guitar
Tim Graves, dobro
Tommy Jackson, fiddle
Ray Kirkland, bass
Jimmy Martin, guitar
Jimmy Mattingly, fiddle
Daryl Mosley, bass
Bobby Osborne, II, guitar/bass
Robby Osborne, guitar/bass/drums
Wynn Osborne, banjo
Ronnie Reno, guitar/bass
Dale Sledd, guitar
Terry Smith, bass
Buddy Spicher, fiddle
Blaine Sprouse, fiddle
Steve Thomas, fiddle
Gene Wooten, dobro
Dana Cupp, Guitar, Banjo
Tim Evans, bass

Discography

Albums

Singles

Footnotes

References
 Goldsmith, Thomas (2004) The Bluegrass Reader, University of Illinois Press
 Ledgin, Stephanie P. (2004) Homegrown Music: Discovering Bluegrass, Greenwood Publishing
 Osborne, Sonny (1964) Bluegrass Banjo, Mel Bay Publications
 Rosenberg, Neil V. (2005) Bluegrass: A History, University of Illinois Press
 Tribe, Ivan M. (2006) Country: A Regional Exploration, Greenwood Publishing Group
 Wolff, Kurt - Duane, Orla (2000) Country Music: The Rough Guide, Rough Guides

External links
Osborne Bros. Festival
Sonny Osborne.com
Bobby Osborne and Rocky Top X-Press
Grand Ole Opry bio
 
 
Sonny Osborne NAMM Oral History Program Interview (2008)
Bobby Osborne NAMM Oral History Program Interview (2011)

Bluegrass musicians from Kentucky
Country music duos
Grand Ole Opry members
Country music groups from Kentucky
RCA Victor artists
Musical groups established in 1953
Musical groups disestablished in 2005
Musical groups from Appalachia
People from Leslie County, Kentucky
1953 establishments in Kentucky
2005 disestablishments in Kentucky
Year of birth missing